President of the National Assembly of Angola is the presiding officer in the National Assembly of Angola.

Presidents of the National Assembly of Angola

Presidents (Speakers) of the People's Assembly of Angola

Presidents (Speakers) of the National Assembly of Angola

Sources

Politics of Angola
 
Angola